The 1966 LSU Tigers football team represented Louisiana State University (LSU) as a member of the  Southeastern Conference (SEC) during the 1966 NCAA University Division football season. Led by fifth-year head coach Charles McClendon, the Tigers compiled an overall record of 5–4–1 with a mark of 3–3 in conference play, placing sixth in the SEC.

Schedule
The game vs. Tulane was designated as a conference game by the Southeastern Conference (SEC), even though the Green Wave exited the league prior to the 1966 season.

References

LSU
LSU Tigers football seasons
LSU Tigers football